Zlatia is a village in the municipality of Dobrichka, in Dobrich Province, in northeastern Bulgaria.

Honours
Zlatiya Glacier on Brabant Island, Antarctica is named after the village.

References

Villages in Dobrich Province